People You Know may refer to:

"People You Know", song from the 2008 album Dance Gavin Dance by Dance Gavin Dance 
"People You Know", song from the 2011 album Outside by Tapes n' Tapes
"People You Know", song from the 2020 album Rare by Selena Gomez 
"People You Know", song by Robynn Ragland